The Apulian regional election of 2005 took place on 3–4 April 2005.

Nichi Vendola (Communist Refoundation Party) defeated incumbent Raffaele Fitto (Forza Italia). The success of Vendola came somewhat unexpected. In a Southern Italian Region, expected to be morally conservative, Vendola, a communist and homosexual, defeated Fitto, a conservative Christian democrat. Vendola was the first candidate ever to be appointed by its coalition through a primary election instead of agreements between parties. A defeat of Vendola might have resulted in a cancellation of the primary election of The Union for choosing the candidate for Prime Minister in the 2006 general election.

Centre-left primary election
The centre-left candidate was chosen through primary elections, which were won by surprise by Nichi Vendola.

Results

References

Elections in Apulia
2005 elections in Italy